Charles Maurice Gray-Stack (1912-1985) was Dean of Ardfert and Chancellor of St Mary's Cathedral, Limerick from 1966 until his death.

Gray-Stack was born in Armagh, educated at Trinity College, Dublin and  ordained in 1939. He began his ecclesiastical career with  curacies at Eglish, Clonevan, Killarney and Rathkeale. He held incumbencies at Adare from 1953 to 1961; and at Kenmare from 1961.

References

People from Armagh (city)
Alumni of Trinity College Dublin
Deans of Ardfert
1985 deaths
1912 births
20th-century Irish Anglican priests